Florennes is a municipality of Wallonia located in the province of Namur, Belgium. As of 1 January 2006, Florennes has a total population of 10,754. The total area is 133.55 km² which gives a population density of 81 inhabitants per km².

The municipality consists of the following districts: Corenne, Flavion, Florennes, Hanzinelle, Hanzinne, Hemptinne, Morialmé, Morville, Rosée, Saint-Aubin and Thy-le-Bauduin.

Florennes hosts Florennes Air Base, a Belgian military airfield which is the home base for F-16 Fighting Falcon jets.

The first week-end of every July, Florennes is a large festival due to the folk walk with a couple of thousand valorous walkers.

Cyclists Firmin Lambot, who won the Tour de France in 1919 and in 1922 and Léon Scieur, who won the Tour in 1921, were born in Florennes.

The village was formerly the site of Florennes Abbey, dissolved during the French Revolution and since entirely demolished.

See also 
 List of protected heritage sites in Florennes

References

External links 
 
Official web site 
http://www.amfesm.be/florennes/florennes.html
http://www.3eme-zouaves.be 

 
Municipalities of Namur (province)